is a city located in Gunma Prefecture, Japan. , the city had an estimated population of 75,442 in 33,589 households, and a population density of 1200 people per km². Tatebayashi is famous for Azalea Hill Park and Bunbuku Chagama of Morin-ji temple.

Geography
Tatebayashi is located in the extreme southeastern portion of Gunma Prefecture in the Kantō Plains, bordered by Tochigi Prefecture to the north. The Tone River and Watarase Rivers sandwich the city to the north and south.

Surrounding municipalities
Gunma Prefecture
 Ōra
 Chiyoda
 Meiwa
 Itakura
Tochigi Prefecture
 Ashikaga
 Sano

Climate
Tatebayashi has a Humid continental climate (Köppen Cfa) characterized by warm summers and cold winters with heavy snowfall.  The average annual temperature in Tatebayashi is 14.5 °C. The average annual rainfall is 1287 mm with September as the wettest month. The temperatures are highest on average in August, at around 26.7 °C, and lowest in January, at around 3.3 °C.

Demographics
Per Japanese census data, the population of Tatebayashi has recently plateaued after a long period of growth. There is a small community of around 200 Rohingya from Myanmar living in Tatebayashi.

History
Tatebayashi is located within traditional Kōzuke Province and has been settled since prehistoric times and there is a continuous record of habitation from the Japanese Paleolithic period 20,000 years ago. During the Edo period, the area of present-day Tatebayashi was a castle town and administrative center of Tatebayashi Domain, a feudal domain under the Tokugawa shogunate.

Tatebayashi Town was created within Ōra District, Gunma Prefecture on April 1, 1889 with the creation of the modern municipalities system after the Meiji Restoration. On April 1, 1954 the town of Tatebayashi and the villages of Satoya, Ōshima, Akabane, Rokugō, Minoya, Tatara, and Watarase merged to form the city Tatebayashi.

Government
Tatebayashi has a mayor-council form of government with a directly elected mayor and a unicameral city council of 18 members. Tatebayashi contributes two members to the Gunma Prefectural Assembly. In terms of national politics, the city is part of Gunma 3rd district of the lower house of the Diet of Japan.

Economy

Tatebayashi is a regional commercial center and transportation hub. Food processing dominates the manufacturing sector of the local economy.

Education
Tatebayashi has 11 public elementary schools and five public middle schools operated by the city government, and two public high schools operated by the Gunma Prefectural Board of Education. There is also one private high school.

University
Kanto Junior College

Transportation

Railway
 Tōbu Railway Isesaki Line
  –  – 
 Tōbu Railway Sano Line
  –  
 Tōbu Railway Koizumi Line
  –

Highway
  – Tatebayashi Interchange

Local attractions
 Site of Tatebayashi Castle
 Gunma Museum of Art
 Tsutsujigaoka Park, a National Place of Scenic Beauty
 Jō-numa marsh
 Tatara-numa marsh
 Moriniji Temple

Sister-city relations
 – Maroochy Shire Council, Australia, since July 1996
 – Kunshan, China, friendship city since 2004

Notable people
Katai Tayama, novelist
Kenjiro Shoda, mathematician
Chiaki Mukai, astronaut and doctor

References

External links

Official Website 

Cities in Gunma Prefecture
Tatebayashi, Gunma